Tundun Abiola a Nigerian lawyer and TV presenter at Arise News.

Biography 
Abiola was born to businessman and politician, Chief MKO Abiola.

She identified Sir David Frost, Ruth Benemesia-Opia, Siene Allwell-Brown and Ronke Ayuba as her inspiration.

She was nominated for the 2021 Nigeria Outlook Women Trailblazer Awards.

Abiola married Benue State-born Atama Attah at the Claridges Hotel, Mayfair, London, it ended shortly after.

References 

Living people
Nigerian television presenters
Nigerian women lawyers
Year of birth missing (living people)